The Oberheim TVS-1A is a polyphonic analogue synthesizer manufactured in the United States and released to the market in 1975. Its two voice digital keyboard can be operated in either polyphonic or monophonic mode. The TVS-1A also featured sample and hold and an onboard 16-step sequencer.

Famous Users
Jean Michel Jarre
Vince Clarke
Vangelis

References

Analog synthesizers
 TVS-1A
Polyphonic synthesizers
Products introduced in 1975